"Saturday Night" is a song recorded by the Scottish pop rock band Bay City Rollers. It was written and produced by Bill Martin and Phil Coulter. The tune is an upbeat rock number with a memorable hook, in which the word "Saturday" is spelled out in a rhythmic, enthusiastic chant.

The original version of the song was recorded and released in the UK in 1973 but did not hit the charts. The original version was sung by Nobby Clark. At the end of 1975, "Saturday Night" was released in the US and hit the number-one spot in January 1976. It was the first Billboard #1 of the US Bicentennial year. The song had been re-recorded for the Rollers' 1974 UK album Rollin' with lead vocals by Les McKeown, Nobby's replacement.  The single also reached number one on the RPM Canadian Singles Chart listing on 10 January 1976. This is the band's sole No. 1 hit in the United States.

In 2019, the song was used in Netflix's Umbrella Academy  series.

Charts

Weekly charts

Year-end charts

Cover versions
Students at the Lochiel, Glenwood, and South Carvolth Schools in Canada covered the song in 1976.  This rendition later appeared on The Langley Schools Music Project album, Innocence & Despair.

The song was covered by English rock band Ned's Atomic Dustbin for the Mike Myers 1993 romantic comedy film So I Married an Axe Murderer. The song also appears on the soundtrack album.

Japanese punk rock band Hi-Standard released a fast-paced cover of the song on their 1996 debut album Growing Up.

Two covers have been aired as the opening theme song for the pre-game show of Hockey Night in Canada: Canadian hard rock band Monster Truck covered first for the 2017–2018 season
while Jane's Party and Shawnee Kish covered the second for the 2021-2022 season.

Sampling
The 'Hey! Ho! Let's Go' chant in "Blitzkrieg Bop" by the Ramones was, according to Tommy Ramone, inspired by "Saturday Night".

Down With Webster's "Satuday Night" and Simple Plan's "Saturday" interpolate the opening "S-A-T-U-R-D-A-Y Night" chant from the Bay City Rollers song.

Credits and personnel
 Production – Bill Martin & Phil Coulter (track A), Phil Wainman (track B)

References

External links

Ned's Atomic Dustbin cover
 

1973 singles
1975 singles
1976 singles
Bay City Rollers songs
Billboard Hot 100 number-one singles
Cashbox number-one singles
RPM Top Singles number-one singles
Oricon International Singles Chart number-one singles
Songs written by Bill Martin (songwriter)
Songs written by Phil Coulter
1973 songs
Arista Records singles